Isabelle Noel-Smith (born 19 July 1988) is an English rugby union player. She made her debut for England in 2011. She was named in the 2017 Women's Rugby World Cup squad for England.

Noel-Smith attended Haberdashers' Monmouth School for Girls. She studied Coach Education and Sports Development at the University of Bath. She has a Postgraduate Certificate in Education and currently teaches at Paragon Junior School in Bath.

References

External links 
 RFU Player Profile

1988 births
Living people
England women's international rugby union players
English female rugby union players
Team Bath rugby union players
England international women's rugby sevens players